Martyn Crucefix (born 1956 in Trowbridge, Wiltshire) is a British poet, translator and reviewer. Published predominantly by Enitharmon Press, his work ranges widely from vivid and tender lyrics to writing that pushes the boundaries of the extended narrative poem. His themes encompass questions of history and identity (particularly in the 1997 collection A Madder Ghost) and – influenced by his translations of Rainer Maria Rilke – more recent work focuses on the transformations of imagination and momentary epiphanies. His new translation of Rilke's Sonnets to Orpheus was published by Enitharmon in the autumn of 2012. Most recent publication is The Time We Turned published by Shearsman Books in 2014.

Life 
Crucefix attended Trowbridge Boys High School, then spent a year studying medicine at Guys Hospital Medical School, before switching to take a first class degree in English Literature at Lancaster University. He completed a D.Phil. at Worcester College, Oxford, writing on the poetry of Percy Bysshe Shelley and Enlightenment and Romantic theories of language. He currently teaches in North London and is married to Louise Tulip. They have two children Tom and Anna.

Poetry 
Crucefix has won numerous prizes including an Eric Gregory Award and a Hawthornden Fellowship. He has published 6 original collections: Beneath Tremendous Rain (Enitharmon, 1990); At the Mountjoy Hotel (Enitharmon, 1993); On Whistler Mountain (Sinclair-Stevenson, 1994); A Madder Ghost (Enitharmon, 1997); An English Nazareth (Enitharmon, 2004);  Hurt (Enitharmon, 2010). His translation of Rainer Maria Rilke's Duino Elegies (Enitharmon, 2006) was shortlisted for the 2007 Popescu Prize for European Poetry Translation and hailed as "unlikely to be bettered for very many years" (Magma) and by the Popescu judges as "a milestone of translation and a landmark in European poetry".

An early selection of Crucefix's work secured an Eric Gregory Award in 1984 and appeared in The Gregory Poems: The Best of the Young British Poets 1983–84, edited and chosen by John Fuller and Howard Sergeant. His first book, Beneath Tremendous Rain (Enitharmon, 1990) was published two years after he had been featured by Peter Forbes in a ‘New British Poets’ edition of Poetry Review. This collection contains his elegy for his friend, the poet and food writer, Jeremy Round, as well as the four part poem 'Water Music' and an extended meditation on language, love and history titled 'Rosetta'. For Herbert Lomas the book showed "Great intelligence and subtlety . . . clearly an outstanding talent from whom great things can be expected". Anne Stevenson wrote:  "Poetry these days, often feels obliged to place conscience over art and make language work for precision, not complexity. In Martyn Crucefix's first collection, something else happens . . . daring to break with secular convention, Crucefix will become a real artist".

During a Hawthornden Fellowship in 1990, Crucefix completed the long poem, ‘At The Mountjoy Hotel’, which went on to win second prize in the Arvon Poetry Competition 1991 (the poem was approvingly judged “controversial” by Selima Hill, one of the selection panel that also included Andrew Motion) and was published as a short-run pamphlet by Enitharmon in 1993. It was also included in Crucefix's second collection, On Whistler Mountain (Sinclair-Stevenson, 1994), opening the book which also contained a second long narrative poem, 'On Whistler Mountain'. This second piece carries the dates New Year 1991 – New Year 1993 and splices putative personal events with material from the First Gulf War, in particular the 'turkey-shoot' of the US air attack on Iraqi forces on the highway north of Al Jahra. Tony Harrison's poem 'A Cold Coming' (1991) refers to the same incident. Poetry Review thought the book proved Crucefix "one of the most mature voices of the 1990s" and it was praised by Tim Liardet: "Crucefix is at his best, bringing physical truths faithfully into an intense focus whilst remaining alive to their more outlandish implications, their capacity for dream-making . . . . tendering poems of love and desire with great delicacy of gesture and movement . . . blending an earthy sensuality with fine cerebral observation". Alan Brownjohn, writing in The Sunday Times wrote of it as a "substantial and rewarding collection . . . highly wrought, ambitious, thoughtful".

A third collection, A Madder Ghost (Enitharmon, 1997), drew on material unearthed in genealogical research ten years earlier. This had revealed that Crucefix's ancestors to be of Huguenot origins, fleeing France in the 1780s to settle in Spitalfields, London, to continue the family trade of clock-making. The book's tripartite structure opens and closes with sequences of fluent, lightly punctuated lyrics in which he explores the anxieties and anticipated pleasures of fatherhood, from conception through the first year of his son's life. Genealogical material forms the middle section and looks to the past for identity, continuity and new ways of understanding the present in a tour de force of narrative interweaving that Vrona Groarke described as "a brave experiment . . . allowing two languages distanced by history and syntax, to swim together in single poems". The book was praised by Anne Stevenson: "It is rare these days to find a book of poems that is so focused, so carefully shaped and so moving".

Poetry collections 
 A Hatfield Mass (2014)
 The Time We Turned (2014)
 Hurt (2010, Enitharmon Press)
 An English Nazareth (2004, Enitharmon Press)
 A Madder Ghost (1997, Enitharmon Press)
 On Whistler Mountain (1994)
 At The Mountjoy Hotel (1993, Enitharmon Press)
 Beneath Tremendous Rain (1990, Enitharmon Press)

Translations 
 Daodejing – a new version in English (2016, Enitharmon Press): translation
 Rilke's ‘Sonnets to Orpheus’(2012, Enitharmon Press): translation
 Rilke's ‘Duino Elegies’ (2006, Enitharmon Press): translation

Poems on the web 
 Audio Recording made at The South Bank Centre in 2012.
 Two poems from 'Essays in Island Logic' (from Hurt)
 Three poems from 'Essays in Island Logic' (from Hurt) with accompanying essay
 'He considers what the young have to teach' (from Hurt)
 'Water-lily' (from Hurt)
 'While There is War' (with audio) (from Hurt)
 'Growth of a poet's mind' (from Hurt)
 'Invocation' (from Hurt)
 'Ivy tunnel at Kenwood' (uncollected)
 'Road' (uncollected)
 'On foot' (uncollected)
 'La Bastide-de-Bousignac' and 'Morning Song' (uncollected)
 'Tortoise' (from An English Nazareth)

Critical writing 
 On recent contemporary poetry about the war in Iraq.
 Review of Sinead Morrissey's Through the Square Window
 Essay on Boris Pasternak's influence on the completion of 'Essays in Island Logic' (from Hurt) with three poems
 On John Milton's On Education: BBC broadcast and the text available at and on YouTube.
 “The Drunken Porter Does Poetry: Metre and Voice in the Poems of Tony Harrison," Originally published in Tony Harrison: Loiner, edited by Sandie Byrne, Clarendon Press, 1997, pp. 161–70.
 Review of Michael Donaghy and Anne-Marie Fyfe
 Review of Philip Levine and Dan Chiasson

References

External links 
 
Essay on Beneath Tremendous Rain and On Whistler Mountain by Michael Peverett

Living people
British translators
British poets
1956 births
Alumni of Lancaster University
British male poets